Paul Erdős (1913–1996) was a Hungarian mathematician. He considered mathematics to be a social activity and often collaborated on his papers, having 511 joint authors, many of whom also have their own collaborators. The Erdős number measures the "collaborative distance" between an author and Erdős. Thus, his direct co-authors have Erdős number one, theirs have number two, and so forth. Erdős himself has Erdős number zero.

There are more than 11,000 people with an Erdős number of two. This is a partial list of authors with an Erdős number of three or less. For more complete listings of Erdős numbers, see the databases maintained by the Erdős Number Project or the collaboration distance calculators maintained by the American Mathematical Society and by zbMATH.

Zero

 Paul Erdős

One

A

 János Aczél
 Ron Aharoni
 Martin Aigner
 Miklós Ajtai
 Leonidas Alaoglu
 Yousef Alavi
 Krishnaswami Alladi
 Noga Alon
 Nesmith Ankeny
 Joseph Arkin
 Boris Aronov
 David Avis

B

 László Babai
 Frederick Bagemihl
 Leon Bankoff
 Paul T. Bateman
 James Earl Baumgartner
 Mehdi Behzad
 Richard Bellman
 Vitaly Bergelson
 Andreas Blass
 Ralph P. Boas Jr
 Béla Bollobás
 John Adrian Bondy
 Joel Lee Brenner
 John Brillhart
 Thomas Craig Brown
 W. G. Brown
 Nicolaas Govert de Bruijn
 R. Creighton Buck
 Stefan Burr
 Steve Butler

C
 Neil J. Calkin
 Peter Cameron
 Paul A. Catlin
 Gary Chartrand
 Phyllis Chinn
 Sarvadaman Chowla
 Fan Chung
 Kai Lai Chung
 Václav Chvátal
 Charles Colbourn
 John Horton Conway
 Arthur Herbert Copeland
 Imre Csiszár

D

 Harold Davenport
 Dominique de Caen
 Jean-Marie De Koninck
 Jean-Marc Deshouillers
 Michel Deza
 Persi Diaconis
 Gabriel Andrew Dirac
 Jacques Dixmier
 Yael Dowker
 Underwood Dudley
 Aryeh Dvoretzky

E

 György Elekes
 Peter D. T. A. Elliott

F

 Vance Faber
 Siemion Fajtlowicz
 Ralph Faudree
 László Fejes Tóth
 William Feller
 Peter C. Fishburn
 Géza Fodor
 Aviezri Fraenkel
 Péter Frankl
 Gregory Freiman
 Wolfgang Heinrich Johannes Fuchs
 Zoltán Füredi

G

 Steven Gaal
 Janos Galambos
 Tibor Gallai
 Fred Galvin
 Joseph E. Gillis
 Leonard Gillman
 Abraham Ginzburg
 Chris Godsil
 Michael Golomb
 Adolph Winkler Goodman
 Basil Gordon
 Ronald J. Gould
 Ronald Graham
 Sidney Graham
 Andrew Granville
 Peter M. Gruber
 Branko Grünbaum
 Hansraj Gupta
 Richard K. Guy
 Michael Guy
 András Gyárfás

H

 András Hajnal
 Gábor Halász
 Haim Hanani
 Frank Harary
 Zdeněk Hedrlín
 Hans Heilbronn
 Pavol Hell
 Fritz Herzog
 Alan J. Hoffman
 Verner Emil Hoggatt Jr.

I

 Albert Ingham

J

 Eri Jabotinsky
 Steve Jackson
 Michael Scott Jacobson
 Svante Janson
 Vojtěch Jarník

K

 Mark Kac
 Paul Chester Kainen
 Shizuo Kakutani
 Egbert van Kampen
 Irving Kaplansky
 Jovan Karamata
 Ke Zhao
 Paul Kelly
 Péter Kiss
 Murray S. Klamkin
 Maria Klawe
 Daniel Kleitman
 Yoshiharu Kohayakawa
 Jurjen Ferdinand Koksma
 Péter Komjáth
 János Komlós
 Steven G. Krantz
 Michael Krivelevich
 Ewa Kubicka
 Kenneth Kunen

L
 Jean A. Larson
 Renu C. Laskar
 Joseph Lehner
 William J. LeVeque
 Winnie Li
 Jack van Lint
 Nati Linial
 László Lovász
 Florian Luca
 Tomasz Łuczak

M

 Robert McEliece
 Brendan McKay
 Menachem Magidor
 Kurt Mahler
 Helmut Maier
 Michael Makkai
 Solomon Marcus
 Giuseppe Melfi
 Eric Charles Milner
 Leon Mirsky
 Hugh Montgomery
 Peter Montgomery
 Shlomo Moran
 Leo Moser
 M. Ram Murty
 V. Kumar Murty

N

 Melvyn B. Nathanson
 Jaroslav Nešetřil
 Elisha Netanyahu
 Donald J. Newman
 Jean-Louis Nicolas
 Ivan M. Niven

O
 Andrew Odlyzko
 Ortrud Oellermann
 Cyril Offord
 Patrick O'Neil

P

 János Pach
 Péter Pál Pálfy
 Torrence Parsons
 George Piranian
 Richard Pollack
 Harry Pollard
 Carl Pomerance
 Lajos Pósa
 Karl Prachar
 David Preiss
 Norman J. Pullman
 George B. Purdy
 László Pyber

R

 Richard Rado
 Kanakanahalli Ramachandra
 S. B. Rao
 Alfréd Rényi
 Bruce Reznick
 Hans Riesel
 Vojtěch Rödl
 Paul C. Rosenbloom
 Bruce Lee Rothschild
 Cecil C. Rousseau
 Lee Albert Rubel
 Arthur Rubin
 Mary Ellen Rudin
 Imre Z. Ruzsa

S

 Horst Sachs
 Michael Saks
 Peter Salamon
 Tibor Šalát
 András Sárközy
 Gábor N. Sárközy
 Richard Schelp
 Andrzej Schinzel
 Leonard Schulman
 Sanford Segal
 Wladimir Seidel
 John Selfridge
 Jeffrey Shallit
 Harold S. Shapiro
 Saharon Shelah
 Allen Shields
 Tarlok Nath Shorey
 Ruth Silverman
 Gustavus Simmons
 Miklós Simonovits
 Navin M. Singhi
 Alexander Soifer
 Vera Sós
 Ernst Specker
 Joel Spencer
 Cameron Leigh Stewart
 Doug Stinson
 Arthur Harold Stone
 Ernst G. Straus
 Mathukumalli V. Subbarao
 Henda Swart
 Mario Szegedy
 Gábor Szegő
 Esther Szekeres
 George Szekeres
 Endre Szemerédi
 Peter Szüsz

T

 Alfred Tarski
 Alan D. Taylor
 Gérald Tenenbaum
 Prasad V. Tetali
 Carsten Thomassen
 Robert Tijdeman
 Vilmos Totik
 William T. Trotter
 Pál Turán
 W. T. Tutte

U

 Stanislaw Ulam
 Kazimierz Urbanik

V

 Bob Vaughan
 Andrew Vázsonyi
 Katalin Vesztergombi
 István Vincze

W

 Samuel S. Wagstaff Jr.
 Douglas West
 R. M. Wilson
 Robin Wilson
 Peter Winkler
 Nick Wormald

Y

 Frances Yao

Z

 Shmuel Zaks
 Stanisław Krystyn Zaremba
 Abraham Ziv

Two

A
 Karen Aardal
 Shreeram Shankar Abhyankar
 Maya Ackerman
 Sibel Adalı
 Leonard Adleman
 Yehuda Afek
 Pankaj K. Agarwal
 Gordon Agnew
 Dorit Aharonov
 Rudolf Ahlswede
 Jin Akiyama
 Ian F. Akyildiz
 Michael H. Albert
 David Aldous
 W. R. (Red) Alford
 Ahmet Alkan
 Eric Allender
 Brian Alspach
 Andris Ambainis
 Warren Ambrose
 Robert Ammann
 Jane Ammons
 Titu Andreescu
 Cabiria Andreian Cazacu
 Hajnal Andréka
 George Andrews
 Tom M. Apostol
 David Applegate
 Zvi Arad
 Dan Archdeacon
 Richard Friederich Arens
 Sandra Arlinghaus
 Sanjeev Arora
 Emil Artin
 Shiri Artstein
 Tetsuo Asano
 Michael Aschbacher
 Richard Askey
 James Aspnes
 Idris Assani
 Mikhail Atallah
 A. O. L. Atkin
 Hagit Attiya
 Herman Auerbach
 Franz Aurenhammer
 Baruch Awerbuch
 Sheldon Axler

B

 Eric Bach
 Christine Bachoc
 Joan Bagaria
 David H. Bailey
 Rosemary A. Bailey
 Alan Baker
 Egon Balas
 Ramachandran Balasubramanian
 Bohuslav Balcar
 Pierre Baldi
 Zoltán Tibor Balogh
 Stefan Banach
 Prith Banerjee
 Maya Bar-Hillel
 Dror Bar-Natan
 Imre Bárány
 Ruth Aaronson Bari
 Martin T. Barlow
 Michael Barnsley
 John D. Barrow
 Tomek Bartoszyński
 Jon Barwise
 Serafim Batzoglou
 Dave Bayer
 Cristina Bazgan
 József Beck
 Edwin F. Beckenbach
 Laurel Beckett
 William Beckner
 L. W. Beineke
 Nuel Belnap
 Valentin Danilovich Belousov
 Alexandra Bellow
 Arthur T. Benjamin
 Georgia Benkart
 Claude Berge
 Bonnie Berger
 George Bergman
 Peter Bergmann
 Elwyn Berlekamp
 Leah Berman
 Bruce C. Berndt
 R. Stephen Berry
 Tom Berson
 Valérie Berthé
 Elisa Bertino
 Andrea Bertozzi
 Abram Samoilovitch Besicovitch
 Evert Willem Beth
 Albrecht Beutelspacher
 Manjul Bhargava
 Vasanti N. Bhat-Nayak
 Louis Billera
 Andrzej Białynicki-Birula
 R. H. Bing
 Kenneth Binmore
 Bryan John Birch
 Garrett Birkhoff
 Pamela J. Bjorkman
 David Blackwell
 Brian Blank
 Woody Bledsoe
 Vincent Blondel
 Manuel Blum
 Mary L. Boas
 Salomon Bochner
 Mary Ellen Bock
 Hans L. Bodlaender
 Anna Bogomolnaia
 Enrico Bombieri
 Dan Boneh
 Carl R. de Boor
 Richard Borcherds
 Christian Borgs
 Allan Borodin
 Karol Borsuk
 David Borwein
 Jonathan Borwein
 Peter Borwein
 Jit Bose
 Raj Chandra Bose
 Fernanda Botelho
 Jean Bourgain
 Stephen R. Bourne
 Mireille Bousquet-Mélou
 Jonathan Bowen
 David William Boyd
 Stephen P. Boyd
 Achi Brandt
 Dietrich Braess
 Steven Brams
 Gilles Brassard
 Richard Brauer
 Mya Breitbart
 Charles Brenner
 Richard P. Brent
 David Bressoud
 Keith Briggs
 Graham Brightwell
 Andrei Broder
 Henk Broer
 Andries Brouwer
 Gavin Brown
 Kenneth Brown
 Richard A. Brualdi
 Andrew M. Bruckner
 Janusz Brzozowski
 Joe P. Buhler
 Edward Burger
 Herbert Busemann

C

 Eugenio Calabi
 Robert Calderbank
 Cristian S. Calude
 M. Elizabeth Cannon
 Charles Cantor
 Sylvain Cappell
 Lennart Carleson
 Gunnar Carlsson
 Leonard Carlitz
 Pierre Cartier
 J. W. S. Cassels
 Yair Censor
 Vint Cerf
 Timothy M. Chan
 K. S. Chandrasekharan
 Subrahmanyan Chandrasekhar
 Zoé Chatzidakis
 Jennifer Tour Chayes
 Bernard Chazelle
 Elliott Ward Cheney Jr.
 Eugenia Cheng
 Otfried Cheong
 Shiing-Shen Chern
 Amanda Chetwynd
 S. A. Choudum
 Maria Chudnovsky
 William Gemmell Cochran
 Henri Cohen
 Henry Cohn
 Alina Carmen Cojocaru
 Sidney Coleman
 Edward Collingwood
 Marston Conder
 Anne Condon
 Robert Connelly
 William J. Cook
 Cristina Conati
 Brian Conrey
 Irving Copi
 Philip Coppens
 Don Coppersmith
 Derek Corneil
 Johannes van der Corput
 Sylvie Corteel
 Collette Coullard
 Thomas M. Cover
 Lenore Cowen
 Harold Scott MacDonald Coxeter
 Richard Crandall
 Claude Crépeau
 Ernest S. Croot III
 Ákos Császár
 Sándor Csörgő
 Marianna Csörnyei

D
 Raissa D’Souza
 Ivan Damgård
 David van Dantzig
 George Dantzig
 Henri Darmon
 Gautam Das
 Sandip Das
 Chantal David
 Kenneth Davidson
 Donald A. Dawson
 Mark de Berg
 Rina Dechter
 Ermelinda DeLaViña
 Erik Demaine
 Arthur P. Dempster
 Cyrus Derman
 Nachum Dershowitz
 Claire Deschênes
 Keith Devlin
 Ronald DeVore
 Luc Devroye
 Alexander Dewdney
 Tamal Dey
 Brenda L. Dietrich
 Jeff Dinitz
 Michael Dinneen
 Irit Dinur
 Stanislav George Djorgovski
 Hans Dobbertin
 David P. Dobkin
 Danny Dolev
 Shlomi Dolev
 Ron Donagi
 David Donoho
 Monroe D. Donsker
 Joseph L. Doob
 Adrien Douady
 Ronald G. Douglas
 Eric van Douwen
 Rod Downey
 Pauline van den Driessche
 Qiang Du
 Alexandra Duel-Hallen
 Tom Duff
 Dwight Duffus
 Michel Duflo
 Andrej Dujella
 Ioana Dumitriu
 Peter Duren
 Rick Durrett
 Pierre Dusart
 Bernard Dwork
 Cynthia Dwork
 Nira Dyn
 Freeman Dyson

E

 Peter Eades
 A. Ross Eckler Jr.
 Katsuya Eda
 Herbert Edelsbrunner
 Jack Edmonds
 Michelle Effros
 Bradley Efron
 Tatyana Pavlovna Ehrenfest
 Andrzej Ehrenfeucht
 Tamar Eilam
 Samuel Eilenberg
 Albert Einstein
 David Eisenbud
 Kirsten Eisenträger
 Noam Elkies
 Edith Elkind
 Joanne Elliott
 Jo Ellis-Monaghan
 Per Enflo
 David Eppstein
 Tamás Erdélyi
 Alexandre Eremenko
 Shimon Even
 Hugh Everett III
 Howard Eves

F

 Ronald Fagin
 Kenneth Falconer
 Jean-Claude Falmagne
 Ky Fan
 Kaitai Fang
 Martin Farach-Colton
 Odile Favaron
 Solomon Feferman
 Charles Fefferman
 Uriel Feige
 Lipót Fejér
 Michael Fekete
 Michal Feldman
 Amos Fiat
 Leah Findlater
 Nathan Fine
 Michael J. Fischer
 Josh Fisher
 Ronald Fisher
 Mary Flahive
 Philippe Flajolet
 Harley Flanders
 Wendell Fleming
 Ciprian Foias
 Jon Folkman
 Matthew Foreman
 M. K. Fort Jr.
 Lance Fortnow
 Lorraine Foster
 Michael Fredman
 Dan Freed
 Michael Freedman
 Chris Freiling
 Juliana Freire
 Peter Freund
 Shmuel Friedland
 John Friedlander
 Harvey Friedman
 Sy Friedman
 Kurt Otto Friedrichs
 Alan M. Frieze
 Monique Frize
 Zdeněk Frolík
 László Fuchs
 D. R. Fulkerson
 William Fulton
 Hillel Furstenberg

G

 Lisl Gaal
 Dov Gabbay
 Haim Gaifman
 David Gale
 Zvi Galil
 Alexander Gamburd
 Mario Garavaglia
 Martin Gardner
 Michael Garey
 John B. Garnett
 Joachim von zur Gathen
 Mai Gehrke
 William Gehrlein
 Jane F. Gentleman
 Ira Gessel 
 Ellen Gethner
 Nassif Ghoussoub
 Edgar Gilbert
 Moti Gitik
 Paul Glaister
 Sheldon Glashow
 Michel Goemans
 Edray Herber Goins
 Stanisław Gołąb
 Warren Goldfarb
 Dorian M. Goldfeld
 Oded Goldreich
 Judy Goldsmith
 Herman Goldstine
 Daniel Goldston
 Shafi Goldwasser
 Eric Goles
 Solomon W. Golomb
 Gene H. Golub
 Marty Golubitsky
 Martin Charles Golumbic
 Ralph E. Gomory
 Amy Ashurst Gooch
 Jacob E. Goodman
 Cameron Gordon
 Mark Goresky
 Henry W. Gould
 Jim Gray
 Ben Green
 Anne Greenbaum
 Curtis Greene
 Catherine Greenhill
 Russell Greiner
 Ulf Grenander
 Thomas N. E. Greville
 Robert C. Griffiths
 Dima Grigoriev
 Geoffrey Grimmett
 Rami Grossberg
 Emil Grosswald
 Martin Grötschel
 Helen G. Grundman
 Chen Guanrong
 Leonidas J. Guibas
 Max Gunzburger
 Yuri Gurevich
 Dan Gusfield
 Gregory Gutin

H
 Ruth Haas
 Hugo Hadwiger
 Jaroslav Hájek
 Mohammad Hajiaghayi
 György Hajós
 S. L. Hakimi
 Heini Halberstam
 Alfred W. Hales
 Marshall Hall
 Paul Halmos
 Dan Halperin
 Joseph Halpern
 Joel David Hamkins
 Katalin Hangos
 Sariel Har-Peled
 Heiko Harborth
 G. H. Hardy
 Glyn Harman
 Leo Harrington
 Pamela E. Harris
 Hiroshi Haruki
 Joel Hass
 Helmut Hasse
 Babak Hassibi
 Johan Håstad
 David Haussler
 Penny Haxell
 Patrick Hayden
 John P. Hayes
 Walter Hayman
 Teresa W. Haynes
 Emilie Virginia Haynsworth
 Neil Heffernan
 Pinar Heggernes
 Katherine Heinrich
 Christine Heitsch
 Harald Helfgott
 John William Helton
 Leon Henkin
 Gabor Herman
 John Hershberger
 Israel Nathan Herstein
 Agnes M. Herzberg
 Silvia Heubach
 Edwin Hewitt
 Graham Higman
 Einar Hille
 Peter Hilton
 David Hinkley
 James William Peter Hirschfeld
 Pascal Hitzler
 Edmund Hlawka
 Dorit S. Hochbaum
 Wilfrid Hodges
 Leslie Hogben
 Susan P. Holmes
 Alfred Horn
 Haruo Hosoya
 Roger Howe
 John Mackintosh Howie
 Ehud Hrushovski
 John F. Hughes
 Roger Hui
 Birge Huisgen-Zimmermann
 Eugénie Hunsicker
 Ferran Hurtado
 Joan Hutchinson
 Martin Huxley

I
 John Iacono
 Oscar H. Ibarra
 Lucian Ilie
 Neil Immerman
 Russell Impagliazzo
 Wilfried Imrich
 Piotr Indyk
 Aubrey William Ingleton
 Kori Inkpen
 Martin Isaacs
 Mourad Ismail
 Kazuo Iwama
 Henryk Iwaniec

J
 David M. Jackson
 Brigitte Jaumard
 Thomas Jech
 David Jerison
 Meyer Jerison
 Mark Jerrum
 Børge Jessen
 Jia Rongqing
 Carl Jockusch
 Charles Royal Johnson
 David S. Johnson
 Ellis L. Johnson
 Norman Johnson
 Norman Lloyd Johnson
 William B. Johnson
 F. Burton Jones
 Peter Jones
 Roger Jones
 Nataša Jonoska
 Bjarni Jónsson
 Dominic Joyce
 Matti Jutila

K

 Richard Kadison
 Jean-Pierre Kahane
 Jeff Kahn
 Gil Kalai
 Olav Kallenberg
 László Kalmár
 Akihiro Kanamori
 Ravindran Kannan
 Kao Cheng-yan
 Lila Kari
 Anna Karlin
 Samuel Karlin
 Narendra Karmarkar
 Richard M. Karp
 Marek Karpinski
 Gyula O. H. Katona
 Gyula Y. Katona
 Ephraim Katzir
 Yitzhak Katznelson
 Louis Kauffman
 Bruria Kaufman
 Ken-ichi Kawarabayashi
 Alexander S. Kechris
 Klara Kedem
 Howard Jerome Keisler
 Joseph Keller
 Leroy Milton Kelly
 Julia Kempe
 Ken Kennedy
 Michel Kervaire
 Pınar Keskinocak
 Harry Kesten
 Tanya Khovanova
 Jack Kiefer
 Clark Kimberling
 Valerie King
 John Kingman
 William English Kirwan
 Signe Kjelstrup
 John R. Klauder
 Sandi Klavžar
 Victor Klee
 Robert Kleinberg
 Bronisław Knaster
 Konrad Knopp
 Donald Knuth
 William Lawrence Kocay
 Christiane Koch
 Simon B. Kochen
 Kunihiko Kodaira
 Sven Koenig
 János Kollár

 Sergei Konyagin
 Eugene Koonin
 Ádám Korányi
 Jacob Korevaar
 András Kornai
 Thomas William Körner
 S. Rao Kosaraju
 Ronnie Kosloff
 Bertram Kostant
 Samuel Kotz
 Anton Kotzig
 Dexter Kozen
 Dmitri Ilyich Kozlov
 Bryna Kra
 Daniel Kráľ 
 Sarit Kraus
 Marc van Kreveld
 Clyde Kruskal
 Joseph Kruskal
 Marek Kuczma
 Harold W. Kuhn
 Markus Kuhn
 Greg Kuperberg
 Krystyna Kuperberg
 Włodzimierz Kuperberg
 Kazimierz Kuratowski
 Věra Kůrková

L
 Miklós Laczkovich
 Jeffrey Lagarias
 Radha Laha
 Ming-Jun Lai
 Tsit Yuen Lam
 Brian LaMacchia
 Joachim Lambek
 Edmund Landau
 Eric Lander
 Stefan Langerman
 Robert Langlands
 Michael Langston
 Monique Laurent
 Kristin Lauter
 Richard Laver
 Lucien Le Cam
 Imre Leader
 Jon Lee
 Charles Leedham-Green
 Jan van Leeuwen
 Derrick Henry Lehmer
 Emma Lehmer
 F. Thomson Leighton
 Abraham Lempel
 László Lempert
 Arjen Lenstra
 Hendrik Lenstra
 Jan Karel Lenstra
 Hanfried Lenz
 Nancy Leveson
 Leonid Levin
 Raphael David Levine
 Norman Levinson
 Donald John Lewis
 Paul Leyland
 André Lichnerowicz
 Katrina Ligett
 Elliott H. Lieb
 Karl Lieberherr
 Thomas M. Liggett
 Joram Lindenstrauss
 Yuri Linnik
 Jacques-Louis Lions
 Richard Lipton
 Barbara Liskov
 John Little
 John Edensor Littlewood
 Andy Liu
 Chung Laung Liu
 Peter A. Loeb
 Ling Long
 Charles Loewner
 Benjamin F. Logan
 Darrell Long
 Judith Q. Longyear
 Lee Lorch
 Paola Loreti
 Catherine A. Lozupone
 Anna Lubiw
 Alexander Lubotzky
 Michael Luby
 R. Duncan Luce
 Edith Hirsch Luchins
 Malwina Łuczak
 Monika Ludwig
 Eugene M. Luks
 Carsten Lund
 Joaquin Mazdak Luttinger
 Roger Lyndon

M
 Kevin McCurley
 Ian G. Macdonald
 Eugene McDonnell
 Joanna McGrenere
 Angus Macintyre
 Sheila Scott Macintyre
 David J. C. MacKay
 John McKay
 Henry McKean
 George Mackey
 Richard McKelvey
 Jeanette McLeod
 Peter McMullen
 Dugald Macpherson
 Jessie MacWilliams
 Roger Maddux
 Thomas L. Magnanti
 Dorothy Maharam
 Ebadollah S. Mahmoodian
 Kira Makarova
 Jitendra Malik
 Dahlia Malkhi
 Maryanthe Malliaris
 Paul Malliavin
 Claudia Malvenuto
 Udi Manber
 Henry Mann
 Heikki Mannila
 Renata Mansini
 Adam Marcus
 Edward Marczewski
 Harry Markowitz
 Alison Marr
 Robert Marshak
 Donald A. Martin
 Gaven Martin
 Anders Martin-Löf
 Katalin Marton
 Dragan Marušič
 Eric Maskin
 David Masser
 James Massey
 William A. Massey
 Claire Mathieu
 Yossi Matias
 Yuri Matiyasevich
 Jiří Matoušek
 Barry Mazur
 Peter Mazur
 Stanisław Mazur
 Victor Mazurov
 Catherine Meadows
 Elizabeth Meckes
 Nimrod Megiddo
 Kurt Mehlhorn
 Nicholas Metropolis
 Albert R. Meyer
 Yves Meyer
 Paul G. Mezey
 Ernest Michael
 Jan Mikusiński
 Olgica Milenkovic
 J. C. P. Miller
 Steven J. Miller
 Victor S. Miller
 Vitali Milman
 Tova Milo
 Michał Misiurewicz
 Joseph S. B. Mitchell
 Michael Mitzenmacher
 Karyn Moffat
 Bojan Mohar
 Joanne Moldenhauer
 Cristopher Moore
 Bernard Moret
 Louis J. Mordell
 Anne C. Morel
 Carlos J. Moreno
 Frank Morgan
 Dana Moshkovitz
 Frederick Mosteller
 Andrzej Mostowski
 Rajeev Motwani
 Theodore Motzkin
 David Mount
 Jennifer Mueller
 Alec Muffett
 Rahul Mukerjee
 Colm Mulcahy
 David Mumford
 J. Ian Munro
 Klaus-Robert Müller
 Jan Mycielski
 Kieka Mynhardt
 Wendy Myrvold
 Lawrence A. Mysak

N

 David Naccache
 Isaac Namioka
 Assaf Naor
 Joseph Seffi Naor
 Moni Naor
 Crispin Nash-Williams
 Evelyn Nelson
 Evi Nemeth
 George Nemhauser
 Yuri Valentinovich Nesterenko
 Nathan Netanyahu
 Nancy Neudauer
 Bernhard Neumann
 Peter M. Neumann
 Víctor Neumann-Lara
 Charles M. Newman
 Miron Nicolescu
 Rolf Niedermeier
 Harald Niederreiter
 Noam Nisan
 Simon P. Norton
 Isabella Novik
 Ruth Nussinov

O
 Frédérique Oggier
 Jim K. Omura
 Mary Jo Ondrechen
 Elizabeth O'Neil
 Ken Ono
 Paul van Oorschot
 Donald Samuel Ornstein
 Joseph O'Rourke
 Patrice Ossona de Mendez
 Deryk Osthus
 Rafail Ostrovsky
 Alexander Ostrowski
 James Oxley

P
 Lior Pachter
 Igor Pak
 Ilona Palásti
 Vladimír Palko
 Rohit Parikh
 Jeff Paris
 Harold R. Parks
 Michal Parnas
 Jonathan Partington
 Oren Patashnik
 Mike Paterson
 Raj Pathria
 Gheorghe Păun
 Jean Pedersen
 Heinz-Otto Peitgen
 David Peleg
 Magda Peligrad
 Peng Tsu Ann
 Yuval Peres
 Hazel Perfect
 Micha Perles
 Ed Perkins
 Charles S. Peskin
 Robert Phelps
 Cynthia A. Phillips
 Christine Piatko
 Subbayya Sivasankaranarayana Pillai
 János Pintz
 Nick Pippenger
 Tomaž Pisanski
 Gilles Pisier
 Toniann Pitassi
 David Plaisted
 Vera Pless
 Michael D. Plummer
 Amir Pnueli
 Henry O. Pollak
 George Pólya
 Irith Pomeranz
 Christian Pommerenke
 Bjorn Poonen
 Alfred van der Poorten
 Victoria Powers
 Cheryl Praeger
 Vaughan Pratt
 Franco P. Preparata
 Gordon Preston
 Calton Pu
 William R. Pulleyblank

Q

 Jean-Jacques Quisquater

R
 Michael O. Rabin
 Charles Rackoff
 Charles Radin
 Stanisław Radziszowski
 Stefan Ralescu
 Kavita Ramanan
 K. G. Ramanathan
 Olivier Ramaré
 Dana Randall
 C. R. Rao
 Sofya Raskhodnikova
 Steen Rasmussen
 Michel Raynaud
 Dijen K. Ray-Chaudhuri
 Alexander Razborov
 Ronald C. Read
 László Rédei
 Raymond Redheffer
 Bruce Reed
 Irving S. Reed
 Oded Regev
 Eva Regnier
 K. B. Reid
 Gesine Reinert
 Edward Reingold
 Omer Reingold
 Jennifer Rexford
 Frigyes Riesz
 John Rigby
 Gerhard Ringel
 Alexander Rinnooy Kan
 John Riordan
 Jorma Rissanen
 Ivan Rival
 Ron Rivest
 Herbert Robbins
 Fred S. Roberts
 Stephen E. Robertson
 Abraham Robinson
 Burton Rodin
 Judith Roitman
 Dana Ron
 Colva Roney-Dougal
 Frances A. Rosamond
 Bill Roscoe
 Jonathan Rosenberg
 Azriel Rosenfeld
 Gian-Carlo Rota
 Klaus Roth
 Tim Roughgarden
 Bimal Kumar Roy
 Marie-Françoise Roy
 Gordon Royle
 Jean E. Rubin
 Ronitt Rubinfeld
 Ariel Rubinstein
 J. Hyam Rubinstein
 Steven Rudich
 Walter Rudin
 Zeev Rudnick
 Arunas Rudvalis
 Sushmita Ruj
 Czesław Ryll-Nardzewski
 Robert Rumely
 Frank Ruskey
 H. J. Ryser

S

 Donald G. Saari
 Thomas L. Saaty
 Gert Sabidussi
 Jörg-Rüdiger Sack
 Edward B. Saff
 Shmuel Safra
 Jawad Salehi
 Raphaël Salem
 Lee Sallows
 Arto Salomaa
 Wojciech Samotij
 E. Sampathkumar
 Peter Sanders
 David Sankoff
 Palash Sarkar
 Peter Sarnak
 Daihachiro Sato
 Carla Savage
 John E. Savage
 Mathias Schacht
 Marion Scheepers
 Boris M. Schein
 Ed Scheinerman
 Wolfgang M. Schmidt
 Claus P. Schnorr
 Hans Schneider
 Isaac Jacob Schoenberg
 Norman Schofield
 Arnold Schönhage
 Oded Schramm
 Alexander Schrijver
 Richard Schroeppel
 Issai Schur
 Jacob T. Schwartz
 Dana Scott
 Jennifer Seberry
 Thomas Dyer Seeley
 Raimund Seidel
 Gary Seitz
 Atle Selberg
 Jean-Pierre Serre
 Brigitte Servatius
 Simone Severini
 Paul Seymour
 Freydoon Shahidi
 Aner Shalev
 Adi Shamir
 Eli Shamir
 Ron Shamir
 Daniel Shanks
 Micha Sharir
 Dennis Shasha
 Nir Shavit
 Scott Shenker
 G. C. Shephard
 Lawrence Shepp
 Goro Shimura
 David Shmoys
 Peter Shor
 Richard Shore
 Robert Shostak
 S. S. Shrikhande
 Wacław Sierpiński
 Joseph H. Silverman
 Barry Simon
 Alistair Sinclair
 Steven Skiena
 Thoralf Skolem
 Brian Skyrms
 Gordon Douglas Slade
 David Slepian
 Neil Sloane
 Cedric Smith
 Temple F. Smith
 Marc Snir
 Gustave Solomon
 Ronald Solomon
 Robert M. Solovay
 József Solymosi
 Kannan Soundararajan
 Diane Souvaine
 Gene Spafford
 Bettina Speckmann
 Terry Speed
 M. Grazia Speranza
 Sarah Spurgeon
 Katherine St. John
 Kaye Stacey
 Jessica Staddon
 Richard P. Stanley
 Ralph Gordon Stanton
 Michael Starbird
 Harold Stark
 Sergey Stechkin
 Mike Steel
 J. Michael Steele
 Angelika Steger
 Kenneth Steiglitz
 Elias M. Stein
 Hugo Steinhaus
 Jacques Stern
 Shlomo Sternberg
 Bonnie Stewart
 Lorna Stewart
 Larry Stockmeyer
 Ivan Stojmenović
 Jorge Stolfi
 Marshall Harvey Stone
 Michael Stonebraker
 Volker Strassen
 Dona Strauss
 Ileana Streinu
 Daniel W. Stroock
 Bernd Sturmfels
 Francis Su
 Benny Sudakov
 Madhu Sudan
 David Sumner
 Patrick Suppes
 Sun Zhiwei
 Subhash Suri
 Klaus Sutner
 Peter Swinnerton-Dyer
 Balázs Szegedy
 Stefan Szeider
 Gábor J. Székely
 Ágnes Szendrei
 Lajos Szilassi
 Wanda Szmielew
 Tamás Szőnyi
 Jayme Luiz Szwarcfiter

T
 Tomohiro Tachi
 Gaisi Takeuti
 Dov Tamari
 Terence Tao
 Richard A. Tapia
 Éva Tardos
 Gábor Tardos
 Robert Tarjan
 Olga Taussky-Todd
 Herman te Riele
 Vanessa Teague
 Max Tegmark
 Shang-Hua Teng
 Katrin Tent
 Audrey Terras
 Diana Thomas
 Robin Thomas
 Heidi Thornquist
 Mikkel Thorup
 William Thurston
 Andrey Nikolayevich Tikhonov
 Naftali Tishby
 John Todd
 Stevo Todorčević
 Nicole Tomczak-Jaegermann
 Tatiana Toro
 Godfried Toussaint
 Marilyn Tremaine
 Ann Trenk
 Luca Trevisan
 Michael Trick
 Jan Trlifaj
 Věra Trnková
 John Truss
 Marcello Truzzi
 Alan Tucker
 Albert W. Tucker
 Thomas W. Tucker
 Bryant Tuckerman
 John Tukey
 Helge Tverberg

U
 George Uhlenbeck
 Jeffrey Ullman
 Chris Umans
 Eli Upfal
 Jorge Urrutia

V
 Jouko Väänänen
 Robert J. Vanderbei
 Harry Vandiver
 Scott Vanstone
 S. R. Srinivasa Varadhan
 Alexander Vardy
 Richard S. Varga
 George Varghese
 Robert Lawson Vaught
 Umesh Vazirani
 Vijay Vazirani
 Santosh Vempala
 Michèle Vergne
 Anatoly Vershik
 Victor Vianu
 Jonathan David Victor
 Mathukumalli Vidyasagar
 Uzi Vishkin
 Vadim G. Vizing
 Margit Voigt
 Marc Voorhoeve
 Petr Vopěnka
 Gheorghe Vrănceanu
 Van H. Vu

W
 Dorothea Wagner
 Stan Wagon
 Abraham Wald
 Michel Waldschmidt
 David J. Wales
 Arnold Walfisz
 Judy L. Walker
 Joseph L. Walsh
 Yusu Wang
 Ian Wanless
 John Clive Ward
 Tandy Warnow
 Stefan E. Warschawski
 Johan Wästlund
 Michael Waterman
 Gerhard Weikum
 Hans Weinberger
 Peter J. Weinberger
 Benjamin Weiss
 Guido Weiss
 Mary Ann Weitnauer
 Lloyd R. Welch
 Dominic Welsh
 Emo Welzl
 Carola Wenk
 Harald Wergeland
 Andrew B. Whinston
 Douglas R. White
 Sue Whitesides
 Hassler Whitney
 David Widder
 Harold Widom
 Norbert Wiener
 Avi Wigderson
 Mark Wilde
 Herbert Wilf
 Alex Wilkie
 Yorick Wilks
 Hugh C. Williams
 Ruth J. Williams
 Robert Arnott Wilson
 Shmuel Winograd
 Hans Witsenhausen
 Gerhard J. Woeginger
 Jack Wolf
 Marek Wolf
 Thomas Wolff
 Jacob Wolfowitz
 Stephen Wolfram
 Carol Wood
 W. Hugh Woodin
 Trevor Wooley
 John Wrench
 E. M. Wright
 Rebecca N. Wright
 Mario Wschebor
 Angela Y. Wu
 Donald Wunsch
 Max Wyman
 Aaron D. Wyner

Y
 Catherine Yan
 Mihalis Yannakakis
 Martin Yarmush
 Andrew Yao
 Shing-Tung Yau
 Bülent Yener
 Cem Yıldırım
 Yiqun Lisa Yin
 J. W. T. Youngs
 Moti Yung

Z
 Adriaan Cornelis Zaanen
 Stathis Zachos
 Don Zagier
 Alexandru Zaharescu
 Thomas Zaslavsky
 Hans Zassenhaus
 Lenka Zdeborová
 Doron Zeilberger
 Karl Longin Zeller
 Ping Zhang
 Günter M. Ziegler
 Tamar Ziegler
 Paul Zimmermann
 Nivio Ziviani
 Vaclav Zizler
 Štefan Znám
 David Zuckerman
 Uri Zwick
 William S. Zwicker
 Antoni Zygmund

Three

A
 Ronald Aarts
 Wil van der Aalst
 Scott Aaronson
 Eduardo Abeliuk
 Hal Abelson
 Ralph Abraham
 Carlisle Adams
 Colin Adams
 Frank Adams
 Jeffrey D. Adams
 Alejandro Adem
 Roy Adler
 Ian Agol
 Manindra Agrawal
 Yakir Aharonov
 Lars Ahlfors
 Alfred Aho
 Michael Aizenman
 Naum Akhiezer
 Stephanie B. Alexander
 Pavel Alexandrov
 Elizabeth S. Allman
 Jonathan Lazare Alperin
 Rajeev Alur
 Nancy M. Amato
 Nina Amenta
 Shimshon Amitsur
 Martyn Amos
 Ross J. Anderson
 Dmitri Anosov
 Huzihiro Araki
 Lars Arge
 Alexander Arhangelskii
 Vladimir Arnold
 Nachman Aronszajn
 Kenneth Arrow
 Sergei N. Artemov
 James Arthur
 Michael Artin
 Matthias Aschenbrenner
 Richard Aster
 Karl Johan Åström
 Krassimir Atanassov
 Frederick Valentine Atkinson
 David August
 Robert Aumann
 Artur Avila
 Luchezar L. Avramov
 Steve Awodey
 James Ax
 Richard Axel
 Ofer Azar

B

 Franz Baader
 John C. Baez
 Ricardo Baeza Rodríguez
 Jennifer Balakrishnan
 John M. Ball
 Keith Martin Ball
 W. W. Rouse Ball
 Thomas Banchoff
 Yehoshua Bar-Hillel
 Rina Foygel Barber
 Nina Bari
 Dwight Barkley
 Paulo S. L. M. Barreto
 Nayandeep Deka Baruah
 Kaye Basford
 Hyman Bass
 Richard F. Bass
 Hannah Bast
 Victor Batyrev
 Paul Baum
 Gilbert Baumslag
 Glen E. Baxter
 Samuel Beatty
 Arnaud Beauville
 Carlo Beenakker
 Robert Behringer
 Jason Behrstock
 John Lane Bell
 Mihir Bellare
 Mordechai Ben-Ari
 John Benedetto
 Charles H. Bennett
 Jonathan Bennett
 Henri Berestycki
 Zvi Bern
 Robert Bernecky
 Douglas Bernheim
 Daniel J. Bernstein
 Dimitri Bertsekas
 Michele Besso
 Hans Bethe
 Stefano Bianchini
 Edward Bierstone
 Eli Biham
 Sara Billey
 Sundance Bilson-Thompson
 Katalin Bimbó
 George David Birkhoff
 Joan Birman
 Alex Biryukov
 Richard L. Bishop
 Robert G. Bland
 David Blei
 Spencer Bloch
 Richard Earl Block
 Leonard Blumenthal
 Harald Bohr
 Andrei Bolibrukh
 George Boolos
 Armand Borel
 Max Born
 Nigel Boston
 Raoul Bott
 Onno J. Boxma
 Robert S. Boyer
 Samuel L. Braunstein
 Marilyn Breen
 Alberto Bressan
 Emmanuel Breuillard
 Haïm Brezis
 Martin Bridson
 Sergey Brin
 Roger W. Brockett
 Michel Broué
 William Browder
 Lawrie Brown
 Morton Brown
 W. Dale Brownawell
 Babette Brumback
 Viggo Brun
 David Buchsbaum
 Adhemar Bultheel
 Donald Burkholder

C

 Luis Caffarelli
 Russel E. Caflisch
 Guido Caldarelli
 Alberto Calderón
 Danny Calegari
 David Callaway
 Robert Horton Cameron
 James W. Cannon
 John Canny
 Jaime Carbonell
 Walter Carnielli
 Élie Cartan
 Henri Cartan
 Mary Cartwright
 Carlos Castillo-Chavez
 Zoia Ceaușescu
 Gregory Chaitin
 Sun-Yung Alice Chang
 Ruth Charney
 Georges Charpak
 Bidyut Baran Chaudhuri
 David Chaum
 Jeff Cheeger
 Xiuxiong Chen
 Shiu-Yuen Cheng
 Cheon Jung-hee
 Herman Chernoff
 Frederic T. Chong
 Gustave Choquet
 Yvonne Choquet-Bruhat
 Howie Choset
 Demetrios Christodoulou
 Isaac Chuang
 Philippe G. Ciarlet
 Mitrofan Cioban
 Kenneth L. Clarkson
 Alfred H. Clifford
 Tim Cochran
 David X. Cohen
 Robert F. Coleman
 Peter Coles
 Francis Collins
 Jean-Louis Colliot-Thélène
 David Colquhoun
 Pierre Conner
 Alain Connes
 Stephen Cook
 Jerome Cornfield
 Athel Cornish-Bowden
 Richard Courant
 Michael Cowling
 David A. Cox
 David Cox
 Michael G. Crandall
 Marc Culler
 Joachim Cuntz
 Charles W. Curtis
 Thomas Curtright

D
 Angelo Dalli
 Sajal K. Das
 Ingrid Daubechies
 James H. Davenport
 Paul Davies
 Chandler Davis
 Martin Davis
 Louis de Branges de Bourcia
 Gérard Debreu
 Percy Deift
 Pierre Deligne
 Ben Delo
 Jesús A. De Loera
 Martin Demaine
 Laura DeMarco
 James Demmel
 Jan Denef
 Dennis DeTurck
 Mike Develin
 Florin Diacu
 Matthew T. Dickerson
 Jean Dieudonné
 Whitfield Diffie
 Robbert Dijkgraaf
 Robert P. Dilworth
 Stanislav George Djorgovski
 Roland Dobrushin
 Manfredo do Carmo
 Simon Donaldson
 Jack Dongarra
 Sergio Doplicher
 Dov Dori
 Michael R. Douglas
 Paul Dourish
 Clifford Hugh Dowker
 Lester Dubins
 Harvey Dubner
 Richard M. Dudley
 George F. D. Duff
 Iain S. Duff
 James Dugundji
 Jon Michael Dunn
 Marcus du Sautoy
 Eugene Dynkin

E

 John Eccles
 Beno Eckmann
 Jean-Pierre Eckmann
 Alan Edelman
 William Edge
 A. W. F. Edwards
 Michelle Effros
 Nikolai Efimov
 Yakov Eliashberg
 Jordan Ellenberg
 George A. Elliott
 Robert J. Elliott
 George F. R. Ellis
 Richard Elman
 Ryszard Engelking
 Charles Epstein
 Arthur Erdélyi
 Karin Erdmann
 Alex Eskin
 Pavel Etingof
 Lawrence C. Evans

F

 Ludvig Faddeev
 Gerd Faltings
 Benson Farb
 Herbert Federer
 Anita Burdman Feferman
 Joan Feigenbaum
 Walter Feit
 Edward Felten
 Werner Fenchel
 Enrico Fermi
 Arran Fernandez
 Richard Feynman
 Tim Finin
 Thomas Fink
 Raphael Finkel
 Hilary Finucane
 Melvin Fitting
 Luciano Floridi
 Gerald Folland
 Sergey Fomin
 Irene Fonseca
 L. R. Ford Jr.
 Ian Foster
 Ralph Fox
 Paul Frampton
 Maurice René Fréchet
 Benedict Freedman
 Laurent Freidel
 Herta Freitag
 Edward Frenkel
 Peter J. Freyd
 Susan Friedlander
 Avner Friedman
 Orrin Frink
 Hans Freudenthal
 Uriel Frisch
 Ferdinand Georg Frobenius
 Jürg Fröhlich
 Bent Fuglede
 Kenichi Fukui
 Wayne A. Fuller

G

 David Gabai
 Ofer Gabber
 Robert G. Gallager
 Giovanni Gallavotti
 Joseph Gallian
 Irene M. Gamba
 Héctor García-Molina
 Richard Garfield
 Skip Garibaldi
 Adriano Garsia
 Erol Gelenbe
 Israel Gelfand
 Alexander Gelfond
 Murray Gell-Mann
 Stuart Geman
 Darren Gergle
 Fritz Gesztesy
 Ezra Getzler
 Eknath Prabhakar Ghate
 Jayanta Kumar Ghosh
 Gary Gibbons
 Garth Gibson
 Peter B. Gilkey
 Jane Piore Gilman
 Seymour Ginsburg
 Ennio de Giorgi
 Samuel Gitler Hammer
 Leslie Greengard
 George Glauberman
 Andrew M. Gleason
 Paul Glendinning
 James Glimm
 Roland Glowinski
 Kurt Gödel
 William Goldman
 Andrew Goldstein
 Jerome Goldstein
 Robert Gompf
 Francisco Javier González-Acuña 
 Michael T. Goodrich
 Maria Gordina
 Carolyn S. Gordon
 Rudolf Gorenflo
 Daniel Gorenstein
 Lothar Göttsche
 Ian Goulden
 Jeremy Gray
 Mary W. Gray
 Matthew D. Green
 Brian Greene
 Robert Griess
 Phillip Griffiths
 Rostislav Grigorchuk
 Mikhail Leonidovich Gromov
 Alexander Grothendieck
 Benedict Gross
 Edna Grossman
 Marcel Grossmann
 John Guckenheimer
 Victor Guillemin
 Robert C. Gunning

H
 Rudolf Haag
 Christopher Hacon
 Mark Haiman
 Petr Hájek
 Thomas Callister Hales
 Peter Gavin Hall
 Joseph Halpern
 Richard S. Hamilton
 Michael Handel
 Robin Hanson
 David Harbater
 David Harel
 Peter G. Harrison
 George W. Hart
 Vi Hart
 James Hartle
 Juris Hartmanis
 Robin Hartshorne
 Allen Hatcher
 Herbert A. Hauptman
 Jane M. Hawkins
 Michael Heath
 Roger Heath-Brown
 Dennis Hejhal
 Sigurður Helgason
 Martin Hellman
 Nadia Heninger
 Monika Henzinger
 Maurice Herlihy
 Dudley R. Herschbach
 Theophil Henry Hildebrandt
 Morris Hirsch
 Friedrich Hirzebruch
 Tony Hoare
 Gerhard Hochschild
 Melvin Hochster
 Maria Hoffmann-Ostenhof
 Guido Hoheisel
 Helge Holden
 Christopher Hooley
 John Hopcroft
 Lars Hörmander
 Susan Howson
 Juraj Hromkovič
 Hua Luogeng
 Nicolaas Marinus Hugenholtz
 June Huh
 András P Huhn
 Gerhard Huisken
 Craig Huneke
 Julian Huppert
 Michael Hutchings

I

 Jun-Ichi Igusa
 Masatoshi Gündüz Ikeda
 Nicole Immorlica
 Leopold Infeld
 Adrian Ioana
 Victor Isakov
 Giuseppe F. Italiano
 Kiyosi Itô
 Kenneth E. Iverson
 Victor Ivrii
 Shokichi Iyanaga

J

 William Jaco
 Nathan Jacobson
 Hervé Jacquet
 Arthur Jaffe
 Antal Jákli
 Markus Jakobsson
 Zvonimir Janko
 Jens Carsten Jantzen
 Ronald Jensen
 Aimee Johnson
 Selmer M. Johnson
 Peter Johnstone
 Jonathan A. Jones
 Vaughan Jones
 Jerzy Jurka

K

 Victor Kac
 Daniel Kahneman
 Yael Tauman Kalai
 Burt Kaliski
 Rudolf E. Kálmán
 Daniel Kane
 Max Karoubi
 Kevin Karplus
 Daniel Kastler
 Michael Katehakis
 Anatole Katok
 Svetlana Katok
 David Kazhdan
 Kiran Kedlaya
 John L. Kelley
 Frank Kelly
 George Kempf
 Brian Kernighan
 Barbara Keyfitz
 Rima Khalaf
 Chandrashekhar Khare
 Olga Kharlampovich
 Subhash Khot
 Clive W. Kilmister
 Robion Kirby
 Alexandre Kirillov
 Frances Kirwan
 Laszlo B. Kish
 Mark Kisin
 Steven Kleiman
 Jon Kleinberg
 Anthony W. Knapp
 Julia F. Knight
 Lars Knudsen
 Christof Koch
 Eddie Kohler
 Joseph J. Kohn
 Walter Kohn
 Daphne Koller
 Maxim Kontsevich
 Robert Kottwitz
 Christoph Koutschan
 Irwin Kra
 Lawrence M. Krauss
 Hans-Peter Kriegel
 Saul Kripke
 Jonas Kubilius
 Vera Kublanovskaya
 Benjamin Kuipers
 Ravi S. Kulkarni
 Shrawan Kumar
 Subodha Kumar
 H. T. Kung
 Ray Kunze
 Philip Kutzko

L

 Izabella Łaba
 Michael Lacey
 Olga Ladyzhenskaya
 Xuejia Lai
 Nan Laird
 Monica S. Lam
 Willis Lamb
 Leslie Lamport
 Peter Landweber
 Carl Landwehr
 Oscar Lanford
 Robert J. Lang
 Serge Lang
 Michael J. Larsen
 Irena Lasiecka
 Greg Lawler
 Ruth Lawrence
 H. Blaine Lawson
 William Lawvere
 Peter Lax
 Robert Lazarsfeld
 Joel Lebowitz
 John Leech
 Solomon Lefschetz
 Olli Lehto
 Richard Lenski
 James Lepowsky
 Jean Leray
 Randall J. LeVeque
 Simon A. Levin
 David K. Levine
 Harold Levine
 Azriel Lévy
 Marta Lewicka
 Harry R. Lewis
 Hans Lewy
 Mark Liberman
 Victor Lidskii
 Lin Fanghua
 Michael Lin
 Yehuda Lindell
 Elon Lindenstrauss
 Joseph Lipman
 Michael L. Littman
 Chiu-Chu Melissa Liu
 Jean-Louis Loday
 François Loeser
 Nikos Logothetis
 Eduard Looijenga
 Cristina Lopes
 Peter James Lorimer
 Jerzy Łoś
 Michael Loss
 Abraham S. Luchins
 Yuri Luchko
 John Edwin Luecke
 Jacob Lurie
 George Lusztig
 Wilhelmus Luxemburg
 Nancy Lynch
 Richard Lyons
 Mikhail Lyubich

M

 Clyde Martin
 William G. McCallum
 Dusa McDuff
 Saunders Mac Lane
 Curtis T. McMullen
 Robert MacPherson
 Gilean McVean
 Kathleen Madden
 Ib Madsen
 Mark Mahowald
 Andrew Majda
 David Makinson
 Benoit Mandelbrot
 Michelle Manes
 Yuri Manin
 Norman Margolus
 Grigory Margulis
 Robert J. Marks II
 Marco Marra
 David B. Massey
 Varghese Mathai
 John N. Mather
 Mitsuru Matsui
 Arthur Mattuck
 Ueli Maurer
 Margaret Maxfield
 J. Peter May
 Vladimir Mazya
 Lambert Meertens
 Alexander Merkurjev
 N. David Mermin
 Chikako Mese
 Silvio Micali
 Haynes Miller
 Pierre Milman
 James Milne
 John Milnor
 Hermann Minkowski
 James Mirrlees
 Maryam Mirzakhani
 Irina Mitrea
 Yurii Mitropolskiy
 Yoichi Miyaoka
 Alexander Molev
 Faron Moller
 Christopher Monroe
 Richard Montague
 Deane Montgomery
 Susan Montgomery
 Calvin C. Moore
 Greg Moore
 John Coleman Moore
 Manfred Morari
 Cathleen Synge Morawetz
 Ernesto Mordecki
 Boris Mordukhovich
 Shigefumi Mori
 Richard I. Morimoto
 Kiiti Morita
 David R. Morrison
 Yiannis N. Moschovakis
 Jürgen Moser
 Emmy Murphy
 Sean Murphy
 John Myhill

N

 Leopoldo Nachbin
 Masayoshi Nagata
 Daniel K. Nakano
 Tadashi Nakayama
 Seema Nanda
 John Forbes Nash Jr.
 Frank Natterer
 Dana S. Nau
 Anil Nerode
 Claudia Neuhauser
 John von Neumann
 Mark Newman
 Ngô Bảo Châu
 Oscar Nierstrasz
 Albert Nijenhuis
 Louis Nirenberg
 James R. Norris
 Pyotr Novikov
 Sergei Novikov
 H. Pierre Noyes

O

 Joseph Oesterlé
 Hee Oh
 Peter O'Hearn
 Andrei Okounkov
 Dianne P. O'Leary
 Olga Oleinik
 Peter J. Olver
 Rosa Orellana
 Lars Onsager
 Alexander Oppenheim
 Øystein Ore
 Stanley Osher
 Steven J. Ostro
 Ross Overbeek
 Mark Overmars
 Michael Overton

P

 Larry Page
 Richard Palais
 Raymond Paley
 Jacob Palis
 Victor Pan
 Greta Panova
 Christos Papadimitriou
 George C. Papanicolaou
 Seymour Papert
 Raman Parimala
 Karen Parshall
 Mihai Pătrașcu
 Wolfgang Pauli
 Jean Pedersen
 Irena Peeva
 Kirsi Peltonen
 Steven Pemberton
 Roger Penrose
 Colin Percival
 Grigori Perelman
 Asher Peres
 John Perry (philosopher)
 Miodrag Petković
 Linda Petzold
 Jean Piaget
 Ragni Piene
 Josef Pieprzyk
 Jill Pipher
 John Platt
 Rudolf Podgornik
 Martyn Poliakoff
 Hugh David Politzer
 Harriet Pollatsek
 Lev Pontryagin
 Florian Pop
 Vladimir Leonidovich Popov
 Tom Porter
 Gopal Prasad
 Bart Preneel
 Ilya Prigogine
 Enrique Pujals
 Geoffrey K. Pullum
 Hilary Putnam
 Ilya Piatetski-Shapiro

Q

 Daniel Quillen
 Frank Quinn

R

 Paul Rabinowitz
 Tibor Radó
 M. S. Raghunathan
 Srinivasa Ramanujan
 Norman Ramsey
 Helena Rasiowa
 Douglas Ravenel
 Michael C. Reed
 David Rees
 Aviv Regev
 Zinovy Reichstein
 John H. Reif
 Howard L. Resnikoff
 Paulo Ribenboim
 Ken Ribet
 John T. Riedl
 Marc Rieffel
 Emily Riehl

 Vincent Rijmen
 Donald Ringe
 Dennis Ritchie
 Igor Rivin
 Neil Robertson
 Julia Robinson
 Tony Robinson
 Matt Robshaw
 Phillip Rogaway
 Murray Rosenblatt
 Pierre Rosenstiehl
 Hugo Rossi
 Markus Rost
 Alvin E. Roth
 Paul W. K. Rothemund
 Linda Preiss Rothschild
 Samarendra Nath Roy
 Karl Rubin
 David Ruelle
 Mari-Jo P. Ruiz
 Mary Beth Ruskai

S

 Pardis Sabeti
 Gerald Sacks
 Amit Sahai
 Anupam Saikia
 Abdus Salam
 Paul Sally
 Alexander Samarskii
 Leonard Sarason
 Michael Saunders
 Pierre Schapira
 Doris Schattschneider
 Anne Schilling
 Michael Schlessinger
 Wilfried Schmid
 Bruce Schneier
 Richard Schoen
 Robert Scholtz
 Jan Arnoldus Schouten
 Erwin Schrödinger
 G. Peter Scott
 Robert Thomas Seeley
 Kristian Seip
 Marjorie Senechal
 Reinhard Selten
 Caroline Series
 C. S. Seshadri
 Suresh P. Sethi
 Igor Shafarevich
 Claude Shannon
 Norman Shapiro
 Lloyd Shapley
 Diana Shelstad
 Nicholas Shepherd-Barron
 Amin Shokrollahi
 Chi-Wang Shu
 Michael Shub
 Mikhail Shubin
 Laurent C. Siebenmann
 Carl Ludwig Siegel
 Joseph Sifakis
 Israel Michael Sigal
 Roman Sikorski
 Jack Silver
 Alice Silverberg
 Rodica Simion
 Herbert A. Simon
 Leon Simon
 Jim Simons
 Charles Sims
 Yakov Sinai
 Alistair Sinclair
 Isadore Singer
 Theodore Slaman
 Ian Sloan
 Nigel Smart
 Stanislav Smirnov
 Hamilton O. Smith
 Agata Smoktunowicz
 Robert I. Soare
 Sergei Sobolev
 Alan Sokal
 Eduardo D. Sontag
 Ralf J. Spatzier
 Donald C. Spencer
 Thomas Spencer
 Emanuel Sperner
 David Spiegelhalter
 Daniel Spielman
 Herbert Spohn
 Vasudevan Srinivas
 Bhama Srinivasan
 J. N. Srivastava
 Gigliola Staffilani
 John R. Steel
 Guy L. Steele Jr.
 Norman Steenrod
 Charles M. Stein
 Robert Steinberg
 Otto Stern
 Ian Stewart
 Clifford Stoll
 Gary Stormo
 Erling Størmer
 Gilbert Strang
 Steven Strogatz
 Michael Struwe
 Catherine Sulem
 Endre Süli
 Dennis Sullivan
 John M. Sullivan
 John Sulston
 Nike Sun
 Michio Suzuki
 Richard Swan
 Katia Sycara
 Stanisław Szarek
 Tibor Szele
 Lucien Szpiro

T

 Sergei Tabachnikov
 Eitan Tadmor
 Daina Taimiņa
 Floris Takens
 Masamichi Takesaki
 Desney Tan
 Yutaka Taniyama
 Daniel Tătaru
 John Tate
 Angus Ellis Taylor
 Jean Taylor
 Michael E. Taylor
 Richard Taylor
 Sridhar Tayur
 Bernard Teissier
 Edward Teller
 Roger Temam
 Chuu-Lian Terng
 Joseph Terwilliger
 Gerald Teschl
 Bernhard Thalheim
 Morwen Thistlethwaite
 George B. Thomas
 Rekha R. Thomas
 Richard Thomas
 Abigail Thompson
 John G. Thompson
 Ulrike Tillmann
 Wolfgang A. Tomé
 Craig Tracy
 Joseph F. Traub
 Lloyd N. Trefethen
 François Trèves
 Satish K. Tripathi
 Hale Trotter
 Stanisław Trybuła
 Boris Tsirelson
 Laurette Tuckerman

U

 Karen Uhlenbeck
 Gunther Uhlmann
 William G. Unruh
 Alasdair Urquhart

V

 Cumrun Vafa
 Ravi Vakil
 Leslie Valiant
 Michel Van den Bergh
 Bartel Leendert van der Waerden
 Leon van der Torre
 Moshe Vardi
 Serge Vaudenay
 Helmut Veith
 T. N. Venkataramana
 Craig Venter
 Rineke Verbrugge
 Sergiy Vilkomir
 Cédric Villani
 Oleg Viro
 Monica Vișan
 Michael Viscardi
 Karen Vogtmann
 Dan-Virgil Voiculescu
 Paul Vojta
 Dieter Vollhardt

W

 Michelle L. Wachs
 David A. Wagner
 Nolan Wallach
 Brian Wandell
 Hao Wang
 G. N. Watson
 Richard Weber
 Charles Weibel
 Steven Weinberg
 Shmuel Weinberger
 Alan Weinstein
 Sherman Weissman 
 Tsachy Weissman 
 Eric W. Weisstein
 Philip Welch
 Barry Wellman
 Raymond O. Wells Jr.
 Katrin Wendland
 Elisabeth M. Werner
 Wendelin Werner
 Jeff Westbrook
 Hermann Weyl
 John Archibald Wheeler
 Arthur Whitney
 Jennifer Widom
 Gio Wiederhold
 Sylvia Wiegand
 Eugene Wigner
 Frank Wilczek
 Andrew Wiles
 Lauren Williams
 Ryan Williams
 Virginia Vassilevska Williams
 David J. Wineland
 Erik Winfree
 Terry Winograd
 Jean-Pierre Wintenberger
 Andreas Winter
 Daniel Wise
 Edward Witten
 Joseph A. Wolf
 Julia Wolf
 Melanie Wood
 William Wootters
 Margaret H. Wright
 Jang-Mei Wu
 Jie Wu
 Joshua Wurman
 Gisbert Wüstholz

X

 Dianna Xu
 Jinchao Xu

Y

 Chen-Ning Yang
 Horng-Tzer Yau
 Vadim Yefremovich
 Cem Yıldırım
 Jean-Christophe Yoccoz
 James A. Yorke
 Noriko Yui

Z

 Norman Zabusky
 Lotfi A. Zadeh
 George Zames
 Oscar Zariski
 Eduard Zehnder
 Andrei Zelevinsky
 Efim Zelmanov
 Robert Zimmer
 Yaakov Ziv
 Max August Zorn
 Steven Zucker

See also 

 Mathematics Genealogy Project
 Six degrees of separation

External links
 Erdős Number Project
 list of all people with Erdős number 1
 list of all people with Erdős number 2
  Distance calculator from MathSciNet
  Distance calculator from zbMATH

Lists of scholars and academics
Lists of mathematicians
Erdos number